Leonardo Mancuso (born 26 May 1992) is an Italian professional footballer who plays as a forward or winger for  club Como, on loan from Monza.

Club career

Early career
Born in Milan, Lombardy, Mancuso was a youth product of AC Milan. He was in the reserve B, or U-18 "Berretti" team, during the 2009–10 season. Mancuso was then promoted to become a member of the reserve "Primavera" during the 2010–11 season; however, he only made a handful of appearances. 

In mid-2011, he was transferred to Serie D (fifth division) team Pizzighettone for the 2011–12 season. On 5 July 2012, Lega Pro (third division) club Carrarese announced that they had signed Mancuso from Pizzighettone in a permanent deal.

In July 2016, Mancuso sign with newly-promoted Serie C (third division) club Sambenedettese. After a strong season, scoring 25 goals in 40 matches, he joined Pescara. On 31 January 2018, Mancuso joined Juventus, with Cristian Bunino moving in the opposite direction. Mancuso immediately returned to Pescara on an 18-month loan.

Empoli
On 13 July 2019, Mancuso signed for Serie B side Empoli. On 28 October 2020, Mancuso scored a hat-trick in Empoli's upset of Serie A side Benevento in the third round of the Coppa Italia. Less than two months later on 12 December, Mancuso scored four times in a 5–2 away victory over Virtus Entella in league action.

Monza
On 20 January 2022, Monza signed Mancuso on a two-year loan with obligation for purchase. Following Monza's Serie A promotion on 29 May 2022, Mancuso's obligation for purchase clause was triggered.

Loan to Como
Mancuso was loaned out to Como for one year.

International career
Mancuso was selected by the Serie D representative team for the Torneo di Viareggio in January 2012. He was called up to Italy under-20 C team in February 2013, and made his debut on 7 February, as half-time substitute for Leonardo Gatto.

Career statistics

Club

References

External links

 
 

1992 births
Footballers from Milan
Living people
Italian footballers
Association football forwards
Association football wingers
A.C. Milan players
A.S. Pizzighettone players
Carrarese Calcio players
A.S. Cittadella players
U.S. Catanzaro 1929 players
A.S. Sambenedettese players
Delfino Pescara 1936 players
Juventus F.C. players
Empoli F.C. players
A.C. Monza players
Como 1907 players
Serie A players
Serie B players
Serie C players
Serie D players